John Armstrong (born 1966) is a British writer and philosopher living in Hobart, Australia.  He was born in Glasgow and educated at Oxford and London, later directing the philosophy program at the University of London's School of Advanced Study. Armstrong was philosopher in residence at the Melbourne Business School and senior adviser to the vice-chancellor of Melbourne University until 2014. In 2014 he became a professorial fellow at the University of Tasmania. He is the author of several books on philosophical themes.

Life and work
Armstrong's work has covered a range of themes including art, beauty, and civilisation.  His work focuses on restoring traditional ways of thought by their modern application.  Positive reviews of Armstrong's books have noted his accessible style and the importance of reviving the concepts of which he talks.  Negative reviews have tended to criticise him for lacking a sense of history and irony.

His recent work has focused around developing a philosophical description of the concept of civilisation and applying it in the context of modern business and the humanities. Armstrong proposes that civilisation can best be thought of occurring when material and spiritual prosperity come together and mutually help each other. He also defines civilisation as "the life-support system for high-quality relationships to people, ideas and objects".

He is friends with Alain de Botton and the two have jointly authored the book Art as Therapy (2013). He works with The School of Life news website The Philosophers' Mail.

Bibliography

 The Intimate Philosophy of Art (2000)
 Conditions of Love: The Philosophy of Intimacy (2002)
 The Secret Power of Beauty: Why Happiness is in the Eye of the Beholder (2005)
 Love, Life, Goethe: How to be Happy in an Imperfect World (2006)
 In Search of Civilisation: Remaking a Tarnished Idea (2009)
 How To Worry Less About Money (2012) The School of Life collection, MacMillan
 Art as Therapy. London: Phaidon, 2013. By Armstrong and Alain De Botton.

References

External links
John Armstrong's Homepage
A list of the top 10 books on love by John Armstrong published in The Guardian.
Glossaire A glossary of terms important to Armstrong (archived in 2012).
Decline reflects poorly on the arts by Armstrong
Reformation and renaissance: New life for the humanities by Armstrong, Griffith Review 31: Ways of Seeing 

1966 births
Living people
Philosophy academics
The School of Life people
Writers from Glasgow